Submarines of the Soviet Navy were developed by numbered "projects", which were sometimes but not always given names. During the
Cold War, NATO nations referred to these classes by NATO reporting names, based on intelligence data, which did not always correspond with the projects. See:

 List of NATO reporting names for ballistic missile submarines
 List of NATO reporting names for guided missile submarines
 List of NATO reporting names for hunter-killer and experimental submarines

The NATO reporting names were based on the British (and later American) habit of naming submarines with a letter of the alphabet indicating the class, followed by a serial number of that class. The names are the radiotelephonic alphabet call sign of a letter of the alphabet. For security purposes, the "pennant numbers" of Soviet submarines were not sequential, any more than those of Soviet surface vessels were.

Most Russian (and Soviet) submarines had no "personal" name, but were only known by a number, prefixed by letters identifying the boat's type at a higher level than her class.  Those letters included:
 К (K): крейсерская (kreyserskaya, "cruiser")
 ТК (TK): тяжелая крейсерская (tyazholaya kreyserskaya, "heavy cruiser")
 Б (B): большая (bolshaya, "large")
 С (S): средняя (srednyaya, "medium")
 М (M): малая (malaya, "small")

Any of those prefixes could have С (S) added to the end, standing for специальная (spetsialnaya) and meaning "designed for special missions":

 New weapon, engines and armament testing
 Submarines for long-range radio communications
 Target submarines for anti-submarine training
 Rescue service submarines
 Covert operations

Diesel-electric

Russo-Japanese War
 
 
 
   single unit/one off unit (class of its own)

World War I era
 
 
 
 
 
 
 Narval-class submarine
 
 Amerikansky Golland (Holland 602GF/602L type)

World War II era

Post-World War II era

Attack submarines

Guided missile submarines

Ballistic missile submarines

Auxiliary submarines

Nuclear-powered

Attack submarines

First generation

Second generation

Third generation

Fourth generation

Guided missile submarines

First generation

Second generation

Third generation

Fourth generation

Ballistic missile submarines

First generation

Second generation

Third generation

Fourth generation

Auxiliary submarines

Footnotes
 Showell, Jak M. U-Boat Century, German Submarine Warfare 1906-2006. Chatham Publishing, Great Britain (2006). .

External links
 Bellona

See also
List of Russian naval engineers

Soviet and Russian
Submarines